HMS Loch Fada was the lead ship of the s of the British Royal Navy, built by John Brown & Company of Clydebank, Scotland, and named after Loch Fada in the Inner Hebrides.

The ship was laid down on 8 June 1943, launched on 14 December, and commissioned in April 1944. She was attached to Captain Johnny Walker's 2nd Escort Group which was detailed to guard the Western Approaches of the British Isles. After the war she was attached to the Londonderry Flotilla until 1952.

Recommissioned in 1955, she operated in the Persian Gulf. After a period of fishery protection after the first "Cod War" between Great Britain and Iceland she served in the Far East from 1962, and supported operations during the Indonesian Confrontation. After decommissioning in 1969 she was used as a testbed in the development of Sea Wolf surface-to-air missiles, and was finally scrapped in 1970.

Service history

World War II
Commissioned in April 1944 Loch Fada joined the 2nd Escort Group at Plymouth in June after sea trials, and was deployed with the Group in anti-submarine operations during the Normandy landings ("Operation Neptune"). The Group was then released from anti-submarine operations and transferred to Derry to support of convoy defence in the North-West Approaches for the rest of the year.

In January 1945 the Group was deployed in the South-Western Approaches for anti-submarine support. On 27 February Loch Fada was involved in the sinking of the U-boat  using depth charges near Penzance, Cornwall. Two hours earlier, U-1018 had attacked convoy BTC 81 about seven miles from Lizard Point, Cornwall (at ). A torpedo hit the Norwegian freighter  which sank within a few minutes, resulting in the death of five of the freighter's Norwegian crew, a 16-year-old British cabin boy, Thomas Boniface, and two British Royal Navy gunners, (part of the DEMS gun crew) including former professional footballer Charlie Sillett.

After the German surrender in May 1945 the Group was transferred to the Home Fleet to support of the re-occupation of Norway.

Londonderry, 1945–1952
In July 1945 Loch Fada was transferred to the Anti-Submarine Flotilla for training duties, based at Derry. In December 1945 and January 1946, as part of "Operation Deadlight", she escorted German U-boats from Loch Ryan out into the North-Western Approaches where they were sunk. The ship then returned to Derry. The Anti-Submarine Flotilla was renamed the 4th Escort Flotilla in September 1946, and to the 3rd Training Flotilla in early 1949. In early 1951 she took part in the search for missing submarine . In April 1952 Loch Fada was laid up at Portsmouth in Reserve.

Upgrade and Persian Gulf, 1955–1961
Loch Fada was one of seven members of her class selected for extensive modernisation in 1953. The single  gun was replaced by the ubiquitous twin  mounting HA/LA Mark XIX and the A/A weaponry was standardised as a single twin mounting Mark V and four single mounting Mark VII for the 40 mm Bofors gun, with a Simple Tachymetric Director shipped for the Mark V. Type 277 radar was fitted with the new ANU antenna array.

She was recommissioned on 21 July 1955 and joined the Home Fleet for exercises and port visits. In November she sailed from Portsmouth for service in the Persian Gulf based at Bahrain. There she carried out regular patrols and visits. In March 1956 Loch Fada was diverted from her usual patrol station and sent to Mombasa to embark Archbishop Makarios who was taken to Mahé, Seychelles, for detention because of his political activities. The ship then sailed to Colombo for a refit, before joining the East Indies Squadron in April for exercises. The ship then visited Cochin, Bombay and Karachi before returning to the Gulf in July.

After a refit, Loch Fada sailed from Portsmouth on 17 May 1957, arriving back at Bahrain on 4 July. In 1958 she resumed her Persian Gulf duties, and in March was sent to search for the Norwegian passenger ship  which was on fire in Indian Ocean. The ship was carrying emigrants from Bremerhaven to Australia. The ship was found abandoned, and taken in tow, and after two days handed over to the Dutch tug Cyclops. Loch Fada then returned to the UK, arriving at Portsmouth on 14 May. After a refit the ship returned to Bahrain in December for the usual patrol duties. In July 1959 an inspection showed that extensive repairs were required and Loch Fada was withdrawn from service and returned to Portsmouth.
 
The ship returned to service in January 1960 attached to the 6th Frigate Squadron. In March and April she was deployed off Iceland on Fishery Protection duties. In June Loch Fada returned to the Persian Gulf patrol, with duties including patrolling tp stop gun running to rebels in Oman, capturing a dhow smuggling explosives, including 60 anti-tank mines on 16 July 1960. She took part in the CENTO "Exercise MIDLINK II" with warships of other nations in October and November. She then cruised along the coast of East Africa calling at Mombasa, Tanga, Lindi, Mtwara and Dar es Salaam, before transiting the Suez Canal in April, to take part in the commemoration of the 20th Anniversary of the Siege of Tobruk, providing men for the ceremonial parade, and firing a Gun Salute for King Idris of Libya. She arrived at Chatham in June for an extensive refit which saw the installation of a centralised air conditioning system and modernisation of her radar, weapons and communications.

Eastern Fleet, 1962–1967
Loch Fada returned to service in June 1962 assigned to the 3rd Frigate Squadron of the Far East Fleet. She arrived at Colombo in October and was deployed in the Indian Ocean, calling at Diego Garcia and Malé, Maldives. From December until February 1963 she was deployed off Borneo to support of military operations during the Indonesia–Malaysia confrontation (the Konfrontasi). In March and April 1963 Loch Fada was deployed for a patrol in Pacific, calling at Manus in the Admiralty Islands, Suva in Fiji, Phoenix Island and Guam, before calling at Hong Kong and then several ports in Japan. She returned to Borneo in June to support military operations and on piracy patrol for the rest of the year.

In 1964 various patrols and exercises occupied the ship, including: "Exercise JET", a multi-national exercise in the Indian Ocean in March, and amphibious exercises with the commando carrier , destroyer  and oiler  in May. From June to August she was assigned to Gulf patrol duties before returning to Singapore. There she remained for the remainder of her active career, patrolling off Borneo, and taking part in exercises. In September 1965 she was transferred to the 26th Escort Squadron when the 3rd Frigate Flotilla disbanded, but remained stationed at Singapore, periodically refitting at Hong Kong. In May 1967 she visited Japanese ports and took part in exercises. Finally in August she sailed for the UK, arriving back at Portsmouth on 11 October 1967, and was decommissioned and laid up in Reserve.

Test ship, 1968–1970
Loch Fada was placed on the Disposal List, and in 1968 was lent to the British Aircraft Corporation for trials of the Sea Wolf missile, then under development. On 5 November 1968 she broke away from her moorings in Luce Bay, near Stranraer and drifted into the Irish Sea. She was recovered and towed to Pembroke Dock where she was found unusable for further trials. This frigate lay at Pembroke Dock until sold for breaking-up by Metal Industries at Faslane, where she arrived on 28 May 1970.

References

Publications
 
 Marriott, Leo, 1983.  Royal Navy Frigates 1945-1983, Ian Allan Ltd.

External links
uboat.net : HMS Loch Fada

 

1943 ships
Ships built on the River Clyde
Fada (K390)
World War II frigates of the United Kingdom
Cold War frigates of the United Kingdom